The 1937 Coppa Italia Final was the final of the 1936–37 Coppa Italia. The match was played on 6 June 1937 between Genova 1893 and Roma. Genoa won 1–0.

Match

References 
Coppa Italia 1936-37 statistics at rsssf.com
 https://www.calcio.com/calendario/ita-coppa-italia-1936/37-finale/2/
 https://www.worldfootball.net/schedule/ita-coppa-italia-1936/37-finale/2/

Coppa Italia Finals
Coppa Italia Final 1937
Genoa C.F.C. matches